John de Ashton  may refer to:

 John de Ashton (seneschal) (died 1428), seneschal of Bayeux
John de Ashton (military commander) (c. 1354 – c. 1398)

See also
John Ashton (disambiguation)